Federico Cervi (born 9 July 1961) is an Italian fencer. He competed at the 1980 and 1988 Summer Olympics.

References

1961 births
Living people
Sportspeople from Brescia
Italian male fencers
Olympic fencers of Italy
Fencers at the 1980 Summer Olympics
Fencers at the 1988 Summer Olympics
Universiade medalists in fencing
Universiade bronze medalists for Italy
Medalists at the 1981 Summer Universiade